This is a list of Microsporidia genera:

References 

Microsporidian